Bolivia Manta is a Bolivian group created in France in 1977 by Carlos and Julio Arguedas who perform traditional music of pre-Hispanic and contemporary music of the Andes, particularly that of the Aymara and Quechua speaking people of Bolivia and also traditional music of peoples of Peru and Ecuador. Bolivia Manta albums is an encyclopedia of Andean folklore, these dances and songs are collected in different parts of Peru, Bolivia and Ecuador, and most tracks are authentic performances of traditional rural music. They perform their music on indigenous flutes, panpipes and drums, as well as stringed instruments introduced since the Spanish conquest. In 1981, the group was awarded the Académie Charles Cros Grand Prix for the album Winayataqui. Four years later they receive a Laser d'or from the Académie du disque français for the album Pak'cha.

Discography
Sartañani (1978)
Winayataqui (1981)
Quechua Music' (1983)Pak'cha (1985)Anata (1986)Tinkuna (1990)Auki Pacha'' (1995)

References

External links

Andean music
Bolivian musical groups